Daniel Arreola Argüello (born 8 October 1985) is a Mexican former professional footballer who played as a defender.

Club career

Atlante
Arreola debuted in the Apertura 2008 season opener, coming in as a sub in the 54th minute, as Atlante beat Deportivo Toluca, 2–1. He scored his first goal on November 12 of that same year against Tecos UAG in a 3–1 win.

Atlas
On 8 June 2016, Atlas made the signing of Arreola official for the Apertura 2016.

International career

Mexico national team
His first international appearance came on March 17, 2010, for the Mexico national team in a 2–1 win over North Korea in Torreón.

Honours
Atlante
CONCACAF Champions League: 2008–09

Alajuelense
CONCACAF League: 2020

References

External links

1985 births
Living people
People from Cancún
Footballers from Quintana Roo
Mexican footballers
Liga MX players
Liga FPD players
Association football forwards
C.F. Pachuca players
Atlético Morelia players
Atlas F.C. footballers
Atlante F.C. footballers
Dorados de Sinaloa footballers
Club Puebla players
L.D. Alajuelense footballers
Mexican expatriate footballers
Expatriate footballers in Costa Rica
Mexican people of Basque descent